"I Alone" is the second single from Live's album, Throwing Copper. The single was released to radio stations in Canada and the United States, but was only released commercially overseas. It reached No. 6 on the Billboard Modern Rock Tracks chart. The song was ranked 62nd best song of the 1990s by VH1.

Live performed "I Alone" at the Woodstock '99 festival on July 23, 1999 in Rome, New York.  The song was featured in the TV shows Homicide: Life on the Street, Beavis and Butt-head, Hindsight, My So-Called Life, and Silicon Valley.

Composition
"I Alone" is written in the key of G major (recorded a half step lower in G♭ major). Kowalczyk's vocal range spans from C#3-G4.

Lead singer Ed Kowalczyk said of the song's lyrics, "People think 'I Alone' is a love song but it really wasn't. The lyrics were more abstract, encompassing a much larger message." He explained the line, "The greatest of teachers won't hesitate to leave you there by yourself chained to fate," by saying that a profound lesson he derived from studying spiritual teachings was that religion and truth must be found for oneself and practiced, rather than just accepting the word of others.

Charts

Track listings
All songs written by Live:

Australian releases
"I Alone" - 3:55
"Pain Lies on the Riverside" - 5:11
"Selling the Drama" (Acoustic) - 3:40

UK releases and German CD
"I Alone" - 3:56
"I Alone" (Acoustic) - 3:48
"Pain Lies on the Riverside" - 5:13

References

External links
Official website
"I Alone" Music Video via YouTube

Live (band) songs
1994 singles
Songs written by Ed Kowalczyk
Song recordings produced by Jerry Harrison
Radioactive Records singles
1994 songs
Rock ballads